The 1978 VFL season was the 82nd season of the Victorian Football League (VFL), the highest level senior Australian rules football competition in Victoria. The season featured twelve clubs, ran from 1 April until 30 September, and comprised a 22-game home-and-away season followed by a finals series featuring the top five clubs.

The premiership was won by the Hawthorn Football Club for the fourth time, after it defeated  by 18 points in the 1978 VFL Grand Final.

Rule changes
 The 19th and 20th men were converted into interchange players, meaning that any two players could be rested at any time, and could return to the field.
 Goal umpires required to touch goal post if the ball had hit post. Also two flags were positioned at one post and one flag at the other to save time when signalling scores.

Night series
 defeated  13.18 (96) to 2.8 (20) in the final.

Premiership season

Round 1

|- bgcolor="#CCCCFF"
| Home team
| Home team score
| Away team
| Away team score
| Venue
| Crowd
| Date
|- bgcolor="#FFFFFF"
| 
| 22.15 (147)
| 
| 9.14 (68)
| Princes Park
| 10,632
| 1 April 1978
|- bgcolor="#FFFFFF"
| 
| 11.14 (80)
| 
| 23.11 (149)
| Western Oval
| 20,420
| 1 April 1978
|- bgcolor="#FFFFFF"
| 
| 15.11 (101)
| 
| 16.13 (109)
| Junction Oval
| 17,030
| 1 April 1978
|- bgcolor="#FFFFFF"
| 
| 19.9 (123)
| 
| 14.18 (102)
| Windy Hill
| 23,562
| 1 April 1978
|- bgcolor="#FFFFFF"
| 
| 11.10 (76)
| 
| 17.16 (118)
| Kardinia Park
| 27,463
| 1 April 1978
|- bgcolor="#FFFFFF"
| 
| 25.24 (174)
| 
| 14.13 (97)
| MCG
| 49,031
| 1 April 1978

Round 2

Round 3

|- bgcolor="#CCCCFF"
| Home team
| Home team score
| Away team
| Away team score
| Venue
| Crowd
| Date
|- bgcolor="#FFFFFF"
| 
| 16.14 (110)
| 
| 15.20 (110)
| MCG
| 35,602
| 15 April 1978
|- bgcolor="#FFFFFF"
| 
| 10.16 (76)
| 
| 21.14 (140)
| Western Oval
| 16,949
| 15 April 1978
|- bgcolor="#FFFFFF"
| 
| 15.15 (105)
| 
| 14.17 (101)
| Windy Hill
| 16,300
| 15 April 1978
|- bgcolor="#FFFFFF"
| 
| 13.20 (98)
| 
| 11.19 (85)
| Princes Park
| 17,765
| 15 April 1978
|- bgcolor="#FFFFFF"
| 
| 18.11 (119)
| 
| 14.18 (102)
| Lake Oval
| 20,733
| 15 April 1978
|- bgcolor="#FFFFFF"
| 
| 16.15 (111)
| 
| 12.14 (86)
| VFL Park
| 39,097
| 15 April 1978

Round 4

|- bgcolor="#CCCCFF"
| Home team
| Home team score
| Away team
| Away team score
| Venue
| Crowd
| Date
|- bgcolor="#FFFFFF"
| 
| 18.17 (125)
| 
| 15.8 (98)
| Kardinia Park
| 20,566
| 22 April 1978
|- bgcolor="#FFFFFF"
| 
| 21.17 (143)
| 
| 18.16 (124)
| Junction Oval
| 13,660
| 22 April 1978
|- bgcolor="#FFFFFF"
| 
| 14.19 (103)
| 
| 15.15 (105)
| Victoria Park
| 28,714
| 22 April 1978
|- bgcolor="#FFFFFF"
| 
| 14.16 (100)
| 
| 17.17 (119)
| Moorabbin Oval
| 29,117
| 22 April 1978
|- bgcolor="#FFFFFF"
| 
| 18.19 (127)
| 
| 18.12 (120)
| MCG
| 14,865
| 22 April 1978
|- bgcolor="#FFFFFF"
| 
| 16.8 (104)
| 
| 19.17 (131)
| VFL Park
| 34,516
| 22 April 1978

Round 5

|- bgcolor="#CCCCFF"
| Home team
| Home team score
| Away team
| Away team score
| Venue
| Crowd
| Date
|- bgcolor="#FFFFFF"
| 
| 19.16 (130)
| 
| 8.11 (59)
| MCG
| 34,212
| 25 April 1978
|- bgcolor="#FFFFFF"
| 
| 14.14 (98)
| 
| 9.11 (65)
| VFL Park
| 43,388
| 25 April 1978
|- bgcolor="#FFFFFF"
| 
| 14.17 (101)
| 
| 15.12 (102)
| Princes Park
| 13,528
| 29 April 1978
|- bgcolor="#FFFFFF"
| 
| 15.20 (110)
| 
| 13.15 (93)
| Western Oval
| 20,328
| 29 April 1978
|- bgcolor="#FFFFFF"
| 
| 19.10 (124)
| 
| 17.13 (115)
| Arden Street Oval
| 31,424
| 29 April 1978
|- bgcolor="#FFFFFF"
| 
| 18.9 (117)
| 
| 17.14 (116)
| Lake Oval
| 20,183
| 29 April 1978

Round 6

Round 7

|- bgcolor="#CCCCFF"
| Home team
| Home team score
| Away team
| Away team score
| Venue
| Crowd
| Date
|- bgcolor="#FFFFFF"
| 
| 14.14 (98)
| 
| 19.11 (125)
| MCG
| 25,904
| 13 May 1978
|- bgcolor="#FFFFFF"
| 
| 27.15 (177)
| 
| 13.13 (91)
| Princes Park
| 9,099
| 13 May 1978
|- bgcolor="#FFFFFF"
| 
| 14.14 (98)
| 
| 14.11 (95)
| Arden Street Oval
| 14,150
| 13 May 1978
|- bgcolor="#FFFFFF"
| 
| 17.11 (113)
| 
| 16.11 (107)
| Moorabbin Oval
| 30,760
| 13 May 1978
|- bgcolor="#FFFFFF"
| 
| 9.14 (68)
| 
| 12.13 (85)
| Victoria Park
| 26,782
| 13 May 1978
|- bgcolor="#FFFFFF"
| 
| 18.18 (126)
| 
| 21.13 (139)
| VFL Park
| 13,072
| 13 May 1978

Round 8

|- bgcolor="#CCCCFF"
| Home team
| Home team score
| Away team
| Away team score
| Venue
| Crowd
| Date
|- bgcolor="#FFFFFF"
| 
| 8.13 (61)
| 
| 20.17 (137)
| MCG
| 21,268
| 20 May 1978
|- bgcolor="#FFFFFF"
| 
| 11.10 (76)
| 
| 7.18 (60)
| Windy Hill
| 21,212
| 20 May 1978
|- bgcolor="#FFFFFF"
| 
| 8.15 (63)
| 
| 9.7 (61)
| Princes Park
| 21,520
| 20 May 1978
|- bgcolor="#FFFFFF"
| 
| 20.16 (136)
| 
| 4.13 (37)
| Lake Oval
| 21,494
| 20 May 1978
|- bgcolor="#FFFFFF"
| 
| 14.5 (89)
| 
| 14.9 (93)
| Western Oval
| 19,096
| 20 May 1978
|- bgcolor="#FFFFFF"
| 
| 9.16 (70)
| 
| 14.15 (99)
| VFL Park
| 27,224
| 20 May 1978

Round 9

|- bgcolor="#CCCCFF"
| Home team
| Home team score
| Away team
| Away team score
| Venue
| Crowd
| Date
|- bgcolor="#FFFFFF"
| 
| 16.13 (109)
| 
| 14.11 (95)
| Kardinia Park
| 21,603
| 27 May 1978
|- bgcolor="#FFFFFF"
| 
| 13.14 (92)
| 
| 18.9 (117)
| Junction Oval
| 11,903
| 27 May 1978
|- bgcolor="#FFFFFF"
| 
| 12.20 (92)
| 
| 10.16 (76)
| Victoria Park
| 28,651
| 27 May 1978
|- bgcolor="#FFFFFF"
| 
| 18.9 (117)
| 
| 8.11 (59)
| Princes Park
| 30,976
| 27 May 1978
|- bgcolor="#FFFFFF"
| 
| 8.9 (57)
| 
| 13.19 (97)
| Moorabbin Oval
| 25,293
| 27 May 1978
|- bgcolor="#FFFFFF"
| 
| 8.12 (60)
| 
| 15.12 (102)
| VFL Park
| 28,231
| 27 May 1978

Round 10

|- bgcolor="#CCCCFF"
| Home team
| Home team score
| Away team
| Away team score
| Venue
| Crowd
| Date
|- bgcolor="#FFFFFF"
| 
| 12.24 (96)
| 
| 8.13 (61)
| Princes Park
| 11,066
| 3 June 1978
|- bgcolor="#FFFFFF"
| 
| 12.14 (86)
| 
| 11.14 (80)
| MCG
| 21,122
| 3 June 1978
|- bgcolor="#FFFFFF"
| 
| 13.7 (85)
| 
| 12.10 (82)
| Arden Street Oval
| 28,828
| 3 June 1978
|- bgcolor="#FFFFFF"
| 
| 24.18 (162)
| 
| 14.8 (92)
| Lake Oval
| 15,738
| 5 June 1978
|- bgcolor="#FFFFFF"
| 
| 19.11 (125)
| 
| 15.14 (104)
| Western Oval
| 30,197
| 5 June 1978
|- bgcolor="#FFFFFF"
| 
| 14.13 (97)
| 
| 18.23 (131)
| VFL Park
| 72,669
| 5 June 1978

Round 11

|- bgcolor="#CCCCFF"
| Home team
| Home team score
| Away team
| Away team score
| Venue
| Crowd
| Date
|- bgcolor="#FFFFFF"
| 
| 16.15 (111)
| 
| 16.18 (114)
| Junction Oval
| 10,300
| 17 June 1978
|- bgcolor="#FFFFFF"
| 
| 16.8 (104)
| 
| 19.19 (133)
| Windy Hill
| 23,302
| 17 June 1978
|- bgcolor="#FFFFFF"
| 
| 17.25 (127)
| 
| 10.7 (67)
| Victoria Park
| 19,931
| 17 June 1978
|- bgcolor="#FFFFFF"
| 
| 23.27 (165)
| 
| 8.17 (65)
| Princes Park
| 25,388
| 17 June 1978
|- bgcolor="#FFFFFF"
| 
| 23.17 (155)
| 
| 14.13 (97)
| MCG
| 22,764
| 17 June 1978
|- bgcolor="#FFFFFF"
| 
| 15.7 (97)
| 
| 17.15 (117)
| VFL Park
| 31,037
| 17 June 1978

Round 12

|- bgcolor="#CCCCFF"
| Home team
| Home team score
| Away team
| Away team score
| Venue
| Crowd
| Date
|- bgcolor="#FFFFFF"
| 
| 20.17 (137)
| 
| 13.16 (94)
| Princes Park
| 28,266
| 24 June 1978
|- bgcolor="#FFFFFF"
| 
| 15.18 (108)
| 
| 18.20 (128)
| MCG
| 14,652
| 24 June 1978
|- bgcolor="#FFFFFF"
| 
| 8.12 (60)
| 
| 13.12 (90)
| Arden Street Oval
| 14,269
| 24 June 1978
|- bgcolor="#FFFFFF"
| 
| 17.9 (111)
| 
| 20.14 (134)
| Moorabbin Oval
| 15,822
| 24 June 1978
|- bgcolor="#FFFFFF"
| 
| 13.19 (97)
| 
| 17.18 (120)
| Lake Oval
| 18,574
| 24 June 1978
|- bgcolor="#FFFFFF"
| 
| 7.14 (56)
| 
| 13.18 (96)
| VFL Park
| 31,636
| 24 June 1978

Round 13

Round 14

|- bgcolor="#CCCCFF"
| Home team
| Home team score
| Away team
| Away team score
| Venue
| Crowd
| Date
|- bgcolor="#FFFFFF"
| 
| 19.7 (121)
| 
| 18.16 (124)
| Arden Street Oval
| 12,599
| 8 July 1978
|- bgcolor="#FFFFFF"
| 
| 20.7 (127)
| 
| 8.11 (59)
| Western Oval
| 13,325
| 8 July 1978
|- bgcolor="#FFFFFF"
| 
| 17.20 (122)
| 
| 18.9 (117)
| MCG
| 24,417
| 8 July 1978
|- bgcolor="#FFFFFF"
| 
| 22.11 (143)
| 
| 13.15 (93)
| Lake Oval
| 16,642
| 8 July 1978
|- bgcolor="#FFFFFF"
| 
| 13.24 (102)
| 
| 14.11 (95)
| Windy Hill
| 29,831
| 8 July 1978
|- bgcolor="#FFFFFF"
| 
| 10.14 (74)
| 
| 13.6 (84)
| VFL Park
| 46,066
| 8 July 1978

Round 15

|- bgcolor="#CCCCFF"
| Home team
| Home team score
| Away team
| Away team score
| Venue
| Crowd
| Date
|- bgcolor="#FFFFFF"
| 
| 10.14 (74)
| 
| 7.13 (55)
| Princes Park
| 16,214
| 15 July 1978
|- bgcolor="#FFFFFF"
| 
| 17.12 (114)
| 
| 12.22 (94)
| Victoria Park
| 23,729
| 15 July 1978
|- bgcolor="#FFFFFF"
| 
| 10.11 (71)
| 
| 19.11 (125)
| Moorabbin Oval
| 18,954
| 15 July 1978
|- bgcolor="#FFFFFF"
| 
| 12.12 (84)
| 
| 10.12 (72)
| Kardinia Park
| 15,700
| 15 July 1978
|- bgcolor="#FFFFFF"
| 
| 15.11 (101)
| 
| 11.17 (83)
| Junction Oval
| 13,550
| 15 July 1978
|- bgcolor="#FFFFFF"
| 
| 2.14 (26)
| 
| 17.13 (115)
| VFL Park
| 16,870
| 15 July 1978

Round 16

|- bgcolor="#CCCCFF"
| Home team
| Home team score
| Away team
| Away team score
| Venue
| Crowd
| Date
|- bgcolor="#FFFFFF"
| 
| 14.9 (93)
| 
| 17.19 (121)
| MCG
| 18,416
| 22 July 1978
|- bgcolor="#FFFFFF"
| 
| 16.8 (104)
| 
| 12.20 (92)
| Kardinia Park
| 16,219
| 22 July 1978
|- bgcolor="#FFFFFF"
| 
| 18.14 (122)
| 
| 17.19 (121)
| Junction Oval
| 12,240
| 22 July 1978
|- bgcolor="#FFFFFF"
| 
| 7.17 (59)
| 
| 15.11 (101)
| Victoria Park
| 32,286
| 22 July 1978
|- bgcolor="#FFFFFF"
| 
| 16.16 (112)
| 
| 9.17 (71)
| Princes Park
| 24,277
| 22 July 1978
|- bgcolor="#FFFFFF"
| 
| 13.8 (86)
| 
| 15.17 (107)
| VFL Park
| 30,200
| 22 July 1978

Round 17

|- bgcolor="#CCCCFF"
| Home team
| Home team score
| Away team
| Away team score
| Venue
| Crowd
| Date
|- bgcolor="#FFFFFF"
| 
| 20.21 (141)
| 
| 13.11 (89)
| Moorabbin Oval
| 13,118
| 29 July 1978
|- bgcolor="#FFFFFF"
| 
| 18.14 (122)
| 
| 10.16 (76)
| Arden Street Oval
| 15,775
| 29 July 1978
|- bgcolor="#FFFFFF"
| 
| 15.15 (105)
| 
| 13.13 (91)
| Lake Oval
| 14,112
| 29 July 1978
|- bgcolor="#FFFFFF"
| 
| 20.16 (136)
| 
| 13.18 (96)
| MCG
| 41,878
| 29 July 1978
|- bgcolor="#FFFFFF"
| 
| 13.17 (95)
| 
| 18.11 (119)
| Princes Park
| 28,132
| 29 July 1978
|- bgcolor="#FFFFFF"
| 
| 16.11 (107)
| 
| 11.11 (77)
| VFL Park
| 32,246
| 29 July 1978

Round 18

|- bgcolor="#CCCCFF"
| Home team
| Home team score
| Away team
| Away team score
| Venue
| Crowd
| Date
|- bgcolor="#FFFFFF"
| 
| 17.10 (112)
| 
| 17.16 (118)
| Western Oval
| 17,285
| 5 August 1978
|- bgcolor="#FFFFFF"
| 
| 11.16 (82)
| 
| 19.10 (124)
| Junction Oval
| 13,022
| 5 August 1978
|- bgcolor="#FFFFFF"
| 
| 11.16 (82)
| 
| 18.13 (121)
| Windy Hill
| 18,410
| 5 August 1978
|- bgcolor="#FFFFFF"
| 
| 14.19 (103)
| 
| 8.14 (62)
| Princes Park
| 43,313
| 5 August 1978
|- bgcolor="#FFFFFF"
| 
| 13.17 (95)
| 
| 14.17 (101)
| MCG
| 12,363
| 5 August 1978
|- bgcolor="#FFFFFF"
| 
| 14.9 (93)
| 
| 9.16 (70)
| VFL Park
| 31,717
| 5 August 1978

Round 19

|- bgcolor="#CCCCFF"
| Home team
| Home team score
| Away team
| Away team score
| Venue
| Crowd
| Date
|- bgcolor="#FFFFFF"
| 
| 13.7 (85)
| 
| 3.19 (37)
| Moorabbin Oval
| 20,933
| 12 August 1978
|- bgcolor="#FFFFFF"
| 
| 18.19 (127)
| 
| 10.10 (70)
| Princes Park
| 15,980
| 12 August 1978
|- bgcolor="#FFFFFF"
| 
| 11.16 (82)
| 
| 10.6 (66)
| Victoria Park
| 24,069
| 12 August 1978
|- bgcolor="#FFFFFF"
| 
| 26.18 (174)
| 
| 8.13 (61)
| Arden Street Oval
| 9,183
| 12 August 1978
|- bgcolor="#FFFFFF"
| 
| 14.8 (92)
| 
| 13.7 (85)
| Kardinia Park
| 15,080
| 12 August 1978
|- bgcolor="#FFFFFF"
| 
| 8.10 (58)
| 
| 9.15 (69)
| VFL Park
| 21,410
| 12 August 1978

Round 20

|- bgcolor="#CCCCFF"
| Home team
| Home team score
| Away team
| Away team score
| Venue
| Crowd
| Date
|- bgcolor="#FFFFFF"
| 
| 19.16 (130)
| 
| 21.10 (136)
| Windy Hill
| 11,984
| 19 August 1978
|- bgcolor="#FFFFFF"
| 
| 24.11 (155)
| 
| 26.11 (167)
| Lake Oval
| 15,259
| 19 August 1978
|- bgcolor="#FFFFFF"
| 
| 9.17 (71)
| 
| 21.13 (139)
| Western Oval
| 12,525
| 19 August 1978
|- bgcolor="#FFFFFF"
| 
| 16.13 (109)
| 
| 19.9 (123)
| MCG
| 59,580
| 19 August 1978
|- bgcolor="#FFFFFF"
| 
| 9.16 (70)
| 
| 19.17 (131)
| Arden Street Oval
| 28,965
| 19 August 1978
|- bgcolor="#FFFFFF"
| 
| 12.11 (83)
| 
| 21.13 (139)
| VFL Park
| 31,677
| 19 August 1978

  were leading  by 55 points at the 10-minute mark of the second quarter before the Magpies hit back to win by 14 points. It was at the time the third-biggest comeback in League history.

Round 21

|- bgcolor="#CCCCFF"
| Home team
| Home team score
| Away team
| Away team score
| Venue
| Crowd
| Date
|- bgcolor="#FFFFFF"
| 
| 15.16 (106)
| 
| 11.19 (85)
| MCG
| 13,488
| 26 August 1978
|- bgcolor="#FFFFFF"
| 
| 13.8 (86)
| 
| 13.10 (88)
| Kardinia Park
| 21,663
| 26 August 1978
|- bgcolor="#FFFFFF"
| 
| 20.14 (134)
| 
| 17.15 (117)
| Junction Oval
| 11,200
| 26 August 1978
|- bgcolor="#FFFFFF"
| 
| 22.15 (147)
| 
| 15.17 (107)
| Victoria Park
| 31,537
| 26 August 1978
|- bgcolor="#FFFFFF"
| 
| 23.7 (145)
| 
| 15.12 (102)
| Princes Park
| 22,397
| 26 August 1978
|- bgcolor="#FFFFFF"
| 
| 7.9 (51)
| 
| 11.11 (77)
| VFL Park
| 22,337
| 26 August 1978

Round 22

|- bgcolor="#CCCCFF"
| Home team
| Home team score
| Away team
| Away team score
| Venue
| Crowd
| Date
|- bgcolor="#FFFFFF"
| 
| 16.15 (111)
| 
| 12.15 (87)
| Arden Street Oval
| 15,607
| 2 September 1978
|- bgcolor="#FFFFFF"
| 
| 13.22 (100)
| 
| 5.8 (38)
| Kardinia Park
| 22,842
| 2 September 1978
|- bgcolor="#FFFFFF"
| 
| 17.16 (118)
| 
| 16.13 (109)
| Princes Park
| 14,534
| 2 September 1978
|- bgcolor="#FFFFFF"
| 
| 19.11 (125)
| 
| 24.12 (156)
| MCG
| 40,267
| 2 September 1978
|- bgcolor="#FFFFFF"
| 
| 16.10 (106)
| 
| 9.12 (66)
| Moorabbin Oval
| 35,850
| 2 September 1978
|- bgcolor="#FFFFFF"
| 
| 11.15 (81)
| 
| 19.20 (134)
| VFL Park
| 17,768
| 2 September 1978

Ladder

Ladder progression
Numbers highlighted in green indicates the team finished the round inside the top 5.
Numbers highlighted in blue indicates the team finished in first place on the ladder in that round.
Numbers highlighted in red indicates the team finished in last place on the ladder in that round.
Subscript numbers indicate ladder position at round's end.

Finals

Elimination final

|- bgcolor="#CCCCFF"
| Home team
| Score
| Away team
| Score
| Venue
| Crowd
| Date
|- bgcolor="#FFFFFF"
| 
| 15.15 (105)
| 
| 9.18 (72)
| VFL Park
| 57,505
| 9 September

Qualifying final

|- bgcolor="#CCCCFF"
| Home team
| Score
| Away team
| Score
| Venue
| Crowd
| Date
|- bgcolor="#FFFFFF"
| 
| 14.14 (98)
| 
| 23.16 (154)
| MCG
| 79,931
| 9 September
|- bgcolor="#FFFFFF"

Semi finals

|- bgcolor="#CCCCFF"
| Home team
| Score
| Away team
| Score
| Venue
| Crowd
| Date
|- bgcolor="#FFFFFF"
| 
| 15.18 (108)
| 
| 13.15 (93)
| MCG
| 91,933
| 16 September
|- bgcolor="#FFFFFF"
| 
| 10.13 (73)
| 
| 12.15 (87)
| VFL Park
| 48,716
| 16 September

Preliminary final

|- bgcolor="#CCCCFF"
| Home team
| Score
| Away team
| Score
| Venue
| Crowd
| Date
|- bgcolor="#FFFFFF"
| 
| 14.12 (96)
| 
| 12.12 (84)
| VFL Park
| 73,354
| 23 September

Grand final

Hawthorn defeated North Melbourne 18.13 (121) to 15.13 (103), in front of a crowd of 101,704 people. (For an explanation of scoring see Australian rules football).

|- bgcolor="#CCCCFF"
| Game
| Home team
| Home team score
| Away team
| Away team score
| Venue
| Crowd
| Date
|- bgcolor="#FFFFFF"
| Grand final
| 
|  18.13 (121)
| 
| 15.13 (103)
| MCG
| 101,704
| 30 September 1978

Awards
 The Brownlow Medal was won by Malcolm Blight of North Melbourne
North Melbourne 17.29 (131) defeated  11.13 (79) in the grand final, held as a curtain-raiser to the seniors grand final at the Melbourne Cricket Ground on 30 September.

Notes

Notable events
 In Round 20, Prime Minister Malcolm Fraser (who was the Number 1 ticket holder for Carlton throughout his time in office) was booed incessantly during the second half of the North Melbourne vs Carlton match at the Arden Street Oval. The booing continued right up to the moment when Mr. Fraser stepped inside his limousine and was driven away from the ground.

See also
 McIntyre "final five" system

References

Bibliography
 Stephen Rogers and Ashley Brown (1998). Every Game Ever Played. 6th ed. Victoria: Penguin Books.

External links
 1978 Season – AFL Tables

Australian Football League seasons
VFL season